Night After Night is a 1932 American pre-Code drama film starring George Raft, Constance Cummings, and Mae West in her first movie role. Others in the cast include Wynne Gibson, Alison Skipworth, Roscoe Karns, Louis Calhern, and Bradley Page. Directed by Archie Mayo, it was adapted for the screen by Vincent Lawrence and Kathryn Scola, based on the Cosmopolitan magazine story Single Night by Louis Bromfield, with West allowed to contribute to her lines of dialogue.

Although Night After Night is not a comedy, it has many comedic moments, especially with the comic relief of West, who plays a supporting role in her screen debut.

Plot
Joe Anton (Raft) is a speakeasy owner who falls in love with socialite Miss Healy (Cummings). He takes lessons in high-class mannerisms from Mabel Jellyman (Skipworth). Joe does not know that Miss Healy only pays attention to him because he lives in the elegant building that her family lost in the Wall Street Crash of 1929. After a risky encounter with his old flame Iris Dawn (Gibson) involving a gun, after which Miss Healy kisses him, Joe is ready to marry her, but she's engaged to her friend Mr. Bolton, although admitting she's just marrying him for his money. Infuriated at her gold digging, Joe tears into her before leaving to instead pursue Iris. Miss Healy follows him back to the speakeasy to tell him off, but she realizes that she has genuinely fallen in love with him. Meanwhile, Maudie Triplett (West) befriends Mrs. Jellyman and offers to hire her as a hostess in one of her elegant beauty parlors.

Cast

 George Raft as Joe Anton
 Constance Cummings as Miss Jerry Healy
 Wynne Gibson as Iris Dawn
 Mae West as Maudie Triplett
 Alison Skipworth as Miss Mabel Jellyman
 Roscoe Karns as Leo
 Louis Calhern as Dick Bolton
 Bradley Page as Frankie Guard
 Al Hill as Blainey
 Harry Wallace as Jerky
 George Templeton as Patsy
 Marty Martyn as Malloy
 Tom Kennedy as Tom (the bartender)

Production 
West portrays a fictionalized version of Texas Guinan and the film remains primarily remembered as the launching pad for her career. Raft campaigned to cast his friend and former employer Guinan herself but the studio opted for West since she was nine years younger. Raft believed that the part would have launched a major film career for Guinan (then aged 48), which proved to be the case for West instead. (West was reportedly a fan of Guinan and incorporated some of the flamboyant Guinan's ideas into her own acts).

The film was Raft's first leading role and came about due to response to his work in Scarface. According to Filmink "this picture is best best remembered today for introducing Mae West to cinema audiences – and she’s brilliant – but Raft was excellent too as a former gangster turned nightclub manager who is having a mid life crisis."

Accolades
The film is recognized by American Film Institute in these lists:
 2005: AFI's 100 Years...100 Movie Quotes:
 Cloakroom Girl: "Goodness, what beautiful diamonds!"
 Maudie Triplett: "Goodness had nothing to do with it, dearie."
 – Nominated

References

External links
 
 
 
Review of film at Variety

1932 films
1932 romantic drama films
American romantic drama films
American black-and-white films
Films based on short fiction
Films based on works by Louis Bromfield
Films directed by Archie Mayo
Films set in New York City
Paramount Pictures films
Films with screenplays by Kathryn Scola
1930s English-language films
1930s American films